Edison Francisco Gómez Bentancour (born November 14, 1990, in Mercedes, Soriano), commonly known as Edison Gómez, is a Uruguayan footballer who plays as a striker for Panserraikos F.C. in the Greek Football League.

External links
 Profile at soccerway
 Profile at zerozero

1990 births
Living people
People from Mercedes, Uruguay
Uruguayan people of Spanish descent
Uruguayan footballers
Association football forwards
Panserraikos F.C. players
Expatriate footballers in Greece
Uruguayan expatriate sportspeople in Greece